Elections to Manchester City Council were held on 2 May 2019, as part of the 2019 United Kingdom local elections. In 2018 Labour retained its majority of the council with 94 seats to the Liberal Democrats making up the opposition of 2, led by former MP John Leech.

Background and campaign
Labour won every seat on Manchester City Council between 2011 and 2015. In 2016, former Liberal Democrat MP John Leech, who lost his seat in Manchester Withington in the 2015 General Election won a seat in Didsbury West and was joined by another Liberal Democrat Councillor in 2018.

Following the resignation of Fallowfield councillor Grace Fletcher-Hackwood on 19 March, two vacancies were filled in the Fallowfield ward; the candidate who received the most votes won the full four-year term and the second placed candidate took over the three years remaining of the vacant seat.

On 25 March, Manchester Lib Dem leader John Leech launched his party's manifesto for the 2019 elections. This was followed by the Green Party launching their manifesto for the local elections on 9 April.

On 15 April, The Times uncovered a number of offensive tweets from Fallowfield Labour candidate Jade Doswell. In 2014, Doswell had tweeted that she was a "little bit sick in my mouth" at the sight of an Israeli flag and claimed the flag was 'offensive' and provocative’. She apologised on a private Facebook post.

On 17 April, Manchester Evening News reported that the Liberal Democrat candidate for Hulme, Daniel Tóth-Nagy, had been suspended from the party after tweeting "There is no such thing as Islamophobia" and making other comments deemed Islamophobic. Tóth-Nagy denied that he had ever "express[ed] hatred or violent against any person", but the party issued a statement condemning the comments and immediately withdrew their support for him.

On 30 April, the Manchester Evening News reported that the Conservative candidate for Charlestown, Charalampos Kagouras, had been dropped by the party as a candidate due to years of racist and Islamophobic posts on social media.

Result

Changes are compared with the 2018 results. Socialist Alternative changes in vote share are compared to the results for Trade Unionist and Socialist Coalition. Where 2 seats were contested simultaneously due to a vacancy the results for that ward have been normalised.

Council composition
Before the election, the composition of the council was:

After the election, the composition of the council is:

Ward results 
Asterisks denote incumbent Councillors seeking re-election. Councillors seeking re-election were elected in 2018, and results are compared to that year's polls on that basis.

Ancoats and Beswick

Ardwick

Baguley

Brooklands

Burnage

Charlestown

Cheetham

Chorlton

Chorlton Park

Clayton and Openshaw

Crumpsall

Deansgate

Didsbury East

Didsbury West

Fallowfield

Gorton and Abbey Hey

Harpurhey

Higher Blackley

Hulme

*On 17 April, Dániel Tóth-Nagy was suspended by the Liberal Democrats over allegedly Islamophobic comments made on social media.

Levenshulme

Longsight

Miles Platting and Newton Heath

Moss Side

Moston

Northenden

Old Moat

Piccadilly

Rusholme

Sharston

Whalley Range

Withington

Woodhouse Park

Changes since this election
On 24 July 2019 it was reported that Majid Dar (Ancoats and Beswick) had been suspended by the Labour Party. He was readmitted to the party and to the Labour group on the council without formal announcement.

On 18 March 2020 Greg Stanton (Didsbury West) resigned from the Liberal Democrats to sit as an independent. Later, in April, he joined the Labour Party.

On , Sue Murphy (Brooklands) died after a long illness.

Clayton and Openshaw by-election 
Clayton and Openshaw councillor Andy Harland died in December 2019. A by-election took place on Thursday 27 February 2020 to fill the vacancy. Changes are compared with the 2019 result.

References

Manchester City Council elections
2019 English local elections
May 2019 events in the United Kingdom
2010s in Manchester